Call of Duty: Black Ops II is a 2012 first-person shooter video game developed by Treyarch and published by Activision. It was released for Microsoft Windows, PlayStation 3, and Xbox 360 on November 12, 2012, and for the Wii U on November 18 in North America and November 30 in PAL regions. Black Ops II is the ninth game in the Call of Duty franchise of video games, a sequel to the 2010 game Call of Duty: Black Ops and the first Call of Duty game for the Wii U. A corresponding game for the PlayStation Vita, Call of Duty: Black Ops: Declassified, was developed by nStigate Games and also released on November 13.

The game's campaign follows up the story of Black Ops and is set in the late 1980s and 2025. In the 1980s, the player switches control between Alex Mason and Frank Woods, two of the protagonists from Black Ops, while in 2025, the player assumes control of Mason's son, David (codenamed "Section"). Both time periods involve the characters pursuing Raul Menendez, a Nicaraguan cartel leader, who is responsible for kidnapping Woods in the 80s and later sparking a second Cold War in 2025. The campaign features nonlinear gameplay and has multiple endings.

Development for the game began soon after the release of Black Ops, with Activision promising that the follow-up would bring "meaningful innovation" to the Call of Duty franchise. Black Ops II is the first game in the series to feature futuristic warfare technology and the first to present branching storylines driven by player choice as well as selecting weapons before starting story mode missions. It also offers a 3D display option. The game was officially revealed on May 1, 2012, following a set of leaked information released during the previous months.

Black Ops II received generally positive reviews from critics, with praise for its gameplay, story, multiplayer, and Zombies mode, but was criticized for its Strike Force missions. The game was a commercial success; within 24 hours of going on sale, the game grossed over $500 million. It had remained the largest entertainment launch of all time until September 2013, when Take-Two Interactive announced that Grand Theft Auto V had grossed $800 million in its first day of release. It went on to sell 7.5 million copies in the U.S. in November 2012, making it the highest-grossing game of the month. A sequel, Call of Duty: Black Ops III, was released in 2015. Call of Duty: Black Ops Cold War, set between Black Ops and Black Ops II, was released on November 13, 2020.

Gameplay

Campaign

Black Ops II is the first Call of Duty video game to feature branching storylines, in which the player's choice affects both the current mission and in turn, the overall course of the story. Known as "Strike Force missions", these branching storylines appear during the 2025 storyline and feature permanent death. The success or failure of these missions can have ramifications for the wider campaign storyline. Choosing one of the missions locks out the others unless the player begins a fresh campaign.

Strike Force missions allow the player to control a number of different war assets, such as unmanned aerial vehicles, jet fighters and robots. If the player dies in a Strike Force mission, the campaign continues recording that loss, as opposed to letting the player load a previously saved checkpoint. The player's progress in the Strike Force missions may go on to change even the plans of the story's antagonist, Raul Menendez. By the end of the game, the player may have changed the results of the new Cold War.

Similarly, in the main story missions, there are certain points where the player is given different choices and paths to progress, which could have an effect on the gameplay, as well as the story. Black Ops II is also the first game in the series to allow the player to customize their loadout before beginning a mission, creating freedom in choosing how to approach a mission.

Multiplayer
One of the biggest changes added to multiplayer mode in Black Ops II is the introduction of Pick 10, a new system within the Create-a-Class menu. Pick 10 gives the player a total of 10 allocation slots in a class, which are used for guns, perks, and grenades. The player can customize the slot allocation, to either have more attachments for a gun, or more perks.

Killstreaks from previous Call of Duty games are renamed as Scorestreaks, which are now earned by gaining points, rather than kills. This allows the player to focus on objective modes, which also earn points towards Scorestreaks.

Unlike past games, weapons in Black Ops II have a progression system, which is used to unlock weapon attachments. After maxing out a weapon's level, the player can choose to "prestige" the gun, similar to how they can prestige the player level, and reset their attachment progress. In exchange, the player can customize their weapons with custom clan tags and emblems.

Black Ops II is also the first Call of Duty game to include a competitive mode. Known as League Play, the mode allows players of similar skill level to be matched together, and play according to the rules of Major League Gaming.

Zombies
Treyarch confirmed that the Zombies mode would return for Black Ops II with new game modes. This is the third Call of Duty game to feature a Zombies mode, following Call of Duty: World at War and Call of Duty: Black Ops, and the first to have game modes other than the traditional Survival mode. Treyarch also confirmed that Zombies would run on the game's multiplayer engine, allowing for a deeper community experience, along with new features. A new, 8 player co-op game called "Grief" is also supported, featuring 2 teams of 4 players competing to survive, unlike the previous games which only supported 4 player online co-op. As with the previous installments, each Zombies map contains "Easter eggs" side quests, which is used to progress the story. Another new mode, "Turned", is introduced with several downloadable content maps, in which one player attempts to survive three player-controlled zombies who must turn the other player into a zombie.

Plot

Single-player campaign

Setting and characters

The single-player campaign features two connected storylines, with the first set from 1986 to 1989 during the final years of the First Cold War, and the other set in 2025 during a Second Cold War and Rare earths trade dispute. The protagonist of Black Ops, Alex Mason (Sam Worthington) returns as the protagonist in the first Cold War section, and chronicles the rise to infamy of the game's primary antagonist, Raul Menendez (Kamar de los Reyes).

The 2025 section of the game features Alex Mason's son David (codenamed Section) (Rich MacDonald) as the protagonist, in which Menendez is plotting against the United States and China, with one of his ultimate goals being to see the United States locked in a new Cold War with China, in revenge for many of his misfortunes. In this era, wars are defined by robotics, cyberwarfare, unmanned vehicles, and other futuristic technology.

Returning characters include Alex Mason's CIA squadmates Frank Woods (James C. Burns) and Jason Hudson (Michael Keaton), former Soviet Army Colonel Lev Kravchenko (Andrew Divoff), and disgraced Red Army Captain Viktor Reznov (Gary Oldman). New characters include: Section's SEAL teammates Mike Harper (Michael Rooker) and Javier Salazar (Celestino Cornielle), their commanding officer Admiral Tommy Briggs (Tony Todd), the CIA double agent Farid (Omid Abtahi), U.S. President Marion Bosworth (Cira Larkin), Strategic Defense Coalition leader General Tian Zhao (Byron Mann), Tacitus Corporation ex-employee Chloe Lynch (codename Karma) (Erin Cahill). The game also features several historical and real-life characters, including: UNITA leader Jonas Savimbi (Robert Wisdom), former Panamanian leader Manuel Noriega (Benito Martinez), Colonel Oliver North (voiced by himself), and former CIA director David Petraeus (Jim Meskimen). Jimmy Kimmel cameos as himself in one of the game's endings, while the rock band Avenged Sevenfold makes a non-canonical appearance at the end of the game.

Story
In 1986, Alex Mason, now retired from active duty, pursues an obscure existence in Alaska with his son, seven-year-old David. Their shaky relationship is further strained when Jason Hudson approaches Mason for an assignment in Cuando Cubango during the height of the Angolan Civil War and South African Border War. Frank Woods and his team have disappeared aiding Jonas Savimbi's UNITA rebels against Angola's Marxist government; their actions have already been disavowed by the CIA, but Hudson hopes to rescue any survivors. Mason and Hudson recover Woods from the Kavango River, subsequently encountering Raul Menendez among a contingent of Cuban military advisers. After a lengthy firefight, the trio are rescued by Savimbi. It is revealed that Menendez is responsible for holding Woods captive after murdering his team.

In light of this, Mason, Woods, and Hudson begin tracking Menendez, an established primary arms dealer for bush conflicts in Southern Africa and Latin America. The CIA later authorize a strike against the unscrupulous Nicaraguan, now making a healthy profit running arms across Soviet-occupied Afghanistan. The trio and Chinese operative Tian Zhao ally with the Afghan Mujahideen against the Soviets. They capture Lev Kravchenko, who survived the grenade explosion with Woods in Vietnam, and interrogate him into disclosing that Menendez has moles inside the CIA before executing him. The Mujahideen then betray the Americans and Zhao, leaving them to die in the Afghan wilderness until their rescue by two unidentified civilians.

The origins of Menendez's anti-American sentiment are revealed. His sister Josefina was disfigured in a fire as part of an insurance fraud masterminded by an American businessman. The CIA sanctions the assassination of Menendez's father after uncovering his ties to South American drug trade. Mason, Woods, Hudson, and Panamanian security forces led by President Manuel Noriega raid Menendez's compound in Nicaragua; during the chaos, Woods inadvertently kills Josefina with a grenade. Conspiring with Noriega to fake his demise, Menendez crosses paths with Mason and Woods again during the American invasion of Panama. Revealing that he had coerced Hudson to be his mole, Menendez captures Hudson and David and has Hudson manipulate Woods into shooting Mason before crippling Woods. He then executes Hudson, promising to return and complete his revenge at a later date.

In 2025, Menendez reemerges as the charismatic leader of Cordis Die, a militant populist movement. His organization stages a cyberattack that cripples the Chinese stock exchanges, forcing their government to leverage its economic influence and sparking a second Cold War between NATO and the Chinese-led Strategic Defense Coalition headed by Zhao. David, now a Navy SEAL Lt. Commander code-named Section, spearheads an effort by American Joint Special Operations Command (JSOC) to track down Menendez. They fail to apprehend him but learn that Menendez is planning a second cyberattack with global repercussions, dependent on a quantum supercomputer engineered by rogue developer Chloe Lynch. Section and two other SEALs, Harper and Salazar, either rescue Lynch by killing Menendez's second-in-command, DeFalco, or he escapes. The "Strike Force" mission "Second Chance" must be completed to rescue Lynch if the latter occurs.

 
JSOC finally capture Menendez in Yemen with the assistance of undercover CIA agent, Farid. However, before being apprehended, Menendez orders Farid to kill a captured Harper. Menendez will execute Farid if he refuses. American forces take Menendez aboard the aircraft carrier U.S.S. Barack Obama, commanded by Admiral Briggs; however, Menendez escapes with the aid of a mole inside JSOC: Salazar. How Salazar's betrayal pans out is determinant on the fates of Lynch, Farid, and DeFalco. Menendez hacks into the U.S. military satellite to seize control of their entire drone fleet. Whether the Americans regain control is determined by whether the Strike Force missions were completed and whether Briggs remains alive to activate the ship's defenses.

Regardless, Menendez uses the drones to attack Los Angeles during a meeting of G20 leaders, hoping to kill them and foment widespread economic and civil chaos. With the drones also targeting several other strategic cities across the U.S. and China, Section escorts the President of the United States to safety in a Cougar HE. Menendez is tracked to Haiti, where Section must either execute or reapprehend him.

Endings
The events of the player's ending are determined on the fates of Menendez, Lynch, and Alex Mason, and whether the Strike Force missions were completed.
 If Section executes Menendez, a video is uploaded to YouTube, where Menendez commands Cordis Die to revolt. Cordis Die supporters launch a massive global insurrection, resulting in the burning of the White House and widespread anarchy. This ending is canon and sets the stage for Call of Duty: Black Ops III.
 If Section reapprehends Menendez and Lynch survives, she will prevent Menendez's cyberattack, and he will remain imprisoned, watching Lynch being interviewed on Jimmy Kimmel Live, where she insults Menendez as he rages in his cell.
 If Section reapprehends Menendez and Lynch was killed or not rescued, Menendez's cyberattack will succeed, and he will break out of prison. He heads to the Vault and kills Woods, then travels to his sister's grave, digs up her corpse, and lights himself on fire.
 If Mason survives being shot by Woods, he will reunite with him and Section. If he does not, David retires from the military after visiting his father's grave.
 If all the Strike Force missions were completed, China and the United States would ally, ending the Second Cold War.

A non-canon ending is unlocked by completing the game, depicting Menendez and Woods performing at a concert with Synyster Gates and M. Shadows of Avenged Sevenfold, with the rest of the characters from the game dancing. It is shown after the 2nd half of the credits and acts as the game's official music video.

Zombies

Characters and setting
Zombies takes place throughout various time periods, mostly focused during the modern time, in a post-apocalyptic world, created as a result of the missile launch from the moon striking the Earth. The majority of the story follows four new characters: Samuel Stuhlinger (David Boat), Marlton Johnson (Scott Menville), Abigail "Misty" Briarton (Stephanie Lemelin) and Russman (Keith Szarabajka). Dr. Edward Richtofen (Nolan North), one of the previous playable characters from the previous game, returns as the demonic announcer, overseeing the four characters. Another returning character is Dr. Ludvig Maxis (Fred Tatasciore), who instructs the new group to help him defeat Richtofen. Players can choose whether to help Maxis or Richtofen, which will have different results once the story ends. The map "Mob of the Dead" features a new crew of characters: Albert "The Weasel" Arlington (Joe Pantoliano), Billy Handsome (Ray Liotta), Michael "Finn" O'Leary (Michael Madsen), and Salvatore "Sal" DeLuca (Chazz Palminteri). The map "Origins" features an alternate version of the original crew: Tank Dempsey (Steven Blum), Nikolai Belinski (also voiced by Tatasciore), Takeo Masaki (Tom Kane), and Richtofen (Nolan North), as well as Maxis' daughter, Samantha (Julie Nathanson).

Story
In Nevada, a team of CIA and CDC operatives investigate a nuclear testing site known as "Nuketown", where they are attacked by zombies. At the same time, Dr. Edward Richtofen seizes control of the zombies by entering the Aether from Group 935's moon base. However, Dr. Ludvig Maxis joins with his daughter Samantha and Richtofen's former allies, Tank Dempsey, Nikolai Belinski, and Takeo Masaki, to thwart him. To end this, Maxis launches three massive nuclear missiles filled with Element 115, the element responsible for the reanimation of dead cells, at the Earth, destroying its atmosphere. One missile completely destroys Nuketown and all present, except for one individual, Marlton Johnson, who escapes after hiding out in the site's bunker.

Ten years later following the events on the Moon, Earth has been reduced to a crumbling, hellish wasteland overrun by zombies. In this new world, four survivors - Samuel Stuhlinger, Abigail "Misty" Briarton, Marlton, and Russman - have banded together to survive in Washington with the help of a bus driven by a robotic driver. The four are contacted by both Richtofen and Maxis, who is now a digital artificial intelligence, for aid against the other. Both former scientists request the four to assist them in powering up a tower within the area to work in their favor. Once done, regardless of the path they choose, they are teleported by Richtofen to a crumbling skyline in Shanghai, China. The four learn of The Flesh, a cannibalistic cult that chooses to eat zombie meat, as well as the beginnings of a new airborne pandemic of Element 115. Stuhlinger is threatened by Richtofen, who knows of his past as a member of The Flesh, which allows only him to hear Richtofen and not the others. At the site, Maxis and Richtofen once again instruct the four to power up a second tower.

Following their battles in Shanghai, Russman leads the group across the continents to a large hole in the ground known as The Rift in Africa, hoping to find answers about the unseen forces commanding them. Richtofen commands Samuel to "mend the rift". The four gain a new ally in the form of a mute giant (real name later known as Arthur) in a Western town warped underground by temporal displacement, and are hampered by a ghostly woman in a massive mansion. In the canonical ending, the group aids Maxis, allowing him to use the power from the towers to enter the Aether and assume ultimate control, trapping Richtofen in a zombie's body. However, the Earth begins shaking, and Maxis explains to the four that he is beginning the process of the destruction of the Earth and humanity to reach Agartha, where he believes Samantha is; in the non-canon ending, the group aids Richtofen, letting him gain unlimited power over the Aether and the Earth, allowing him to kill Maxis and condemn Samantha's soul to eternal damnation.

Following the canonical ending, Maxis then plucks Samantha's soul from Richtofen's body on the Moon and forces her to join him in Agartha. Realizing her father has been corrupted by the Aether, Samantha reaches out to an alternate version of him, who resides in Dimension 63. She ends up in 1918 in France during World War I, where Group 935 was formed much earlier, with Maxis as one of its leaders, operating to secure German victory in the war. Group 935 created mechanical robots, as well as staffs that control the powers of the elements. Stumbling upon an ancient tomb believed to be of Vril origin, they accidentally unleash the first known zombie outbreak in history. Aiming to stop Germany, Japan, Russia and the United States of America send Takeo, Nikolai and Dempsey to capture Richtofen, the mastermind behind the advanced technology. By this time, Group 935's operatives have been wiped out, and Maxis himself was lobotomized when he began to turn into a zombie. The group are contacted by Samantha, who begs them to free her from Agartha. Richtofen puts Maxis' brain in a flying drone, and he joins the fight against the zombies and to free Samantha. The group is eventually successful, and while Maxis meets his daughter, they enter Agartha to be rewarded. A cutscene is played, showing Samantha with a boy named Eddie inside a house playing with toys of the characters who have appeared in the Zombies game mode throughout all three games. Air raid sirens are heard and the two children retreat to the basement with Maxis, with Samantha noting her father has a plan to make the heroes of their games real.

A separate story, "Mob of the Dead", taking place also in Dimension 63, focuses on four mobsters: Salvatore "Sal" DeLuca, Billy Handsome, Michael "Finn" O'Leary, and Albert "The Weasel" Arlington, who are incarcerated at Alcatraz Island. On New Year's Eve 1933, the four attempt to escape the prison, using Weasel's plan to build a makeshift airplane called Icarus. However, the prison becomes infested with zombies, and they are forced to fight their way out. They succeed in building the airplane, but crash-land at the Golden Gate Bridge. They are then teleported back to the prison, with no memories of their previous attempt (except Weasel, who keeps a journal of the ongoing events). They continuously try to escape, but the result remains the same. After many failures, they discover that they were actually stuck in Purgatory, constantly repeating a cycle as punishment for their past sins. In reality, the escape plan never came to fruition, and Weasel was killed by the other three on New Year's Eve, while the rest were given the death penalty weeks later. Having remembered the truth, Sal, Billy and Finn set out to kill Weasel once again. Two possible endings can occur: if Weasel is killed, the cycle repeats once again; if Weasel lives and the other three are killed, the cycle is broken, and he is finally freed of his punishment. The latter ending is canonical.

Development
Activision Blizzard CEO Robert Kotick stated on November 8, 2011, that a new Call of Duty game was in development for a 2012 release and would be the newest installment in the franchise. The game was officially confirmed by Activision during its fourth-quarter earnings call on February 9, 2012, who promised that it would feature "meaningful innovation" for the series. Oliver North, who was involved in the Iran–Contra affair was a consultant on the 1980s portion and helped promote the game. The author and defense expert Peter W. Singer served as a consultant on the 2025 storyline of the game.

Internal leaks
In February 2012, a product page for Call of Duty: Black Ops 2 appeared on Amazon France and was quickly taken down. No information had yet been released by Activision, but Gameblog claimed that Activision demanded the removal of its original report too. When it refused to do so, the publisher reportedly cut off Gameblog from ad support, review game mailings, and future Activision events for refusing to comply. Activision denied Gameblog's claims that it had been cut off. Around the same time, computer game artist Hugo Beyer also listed "Black Ops 2" as his current project in his LinkedIn CV, then removed his LinkedIn page. Beyer is an artist working for Nerve Software, "a Dallas-based independent developer" which has "helped" with previous Activision games including Black Ops in 2010. A "Black Ops 2" trademark by Activision was spotted January 2012. Further, Black Ops 2 was listed by the France international entertainment retail chain Fnac in March 2012, which touted a predictable November release date.

On April 9, 2012, an image was leaked on the official Call of Duty website, which leaked the Call of Duty: Black Ops 2 logo, as well as a revealing date of April 28, 2012. The URL was later removed. On April 18, 2012, Kotaku received an image from "a retail source", which showed a teaser poster that lacked a game title but had clear clues to Black Ops and a May 2 date that seemingly points to an unveiling. On April 27, 2012, an image containing two Target pre-order cards sent by IGN reader Richard confirmed the game's title and release date. The cards clearly display the Call of Duty: Black Ops II logo, and the release date November 13, 2012.

Reveal

On April 23, 2012, Activision redesigned CallofDuty.com to announce that the game would be revealed on May 1, 2012, during the NBA playoffs on TNT. The art featured on the site matched up perfectly with the supposed retailer leak received by Kotaku. However, parts of the official website went live hours prior to the announcement, which revealed the title, confirmed the release date for PC, PlayStation 3 and Xbox 360, and the "21st Century Cold War" setting. Activision had hinted that the game may eventually become available for Nintendo's own consoles, although had no official announcements for the time being. As promised by Activision, the preview for the game was revealed in the form of a YouTube trailer that detailed the futuristic setting, the characters carried over from the previous games, and the conflict.

After the game was revealed, the preorder rates on the game set records three times higher than for the preorders of the first Black Ops. Critics have noted the trailer's similarities to that of Metal Gear Solid 4: Guns of the Patriots. On July 19, 2012, a second trailer was released by Treyarch, offering insight into the game's narrative. The storyline was described by writer David S. Goyer as "better than a Hollywood movie".

Gameplay revisions

In developing Black Ops II, Treyarch introduced several revisions to the gameplay mechanics for online multiplayer that have been a hallmark of the Call of Duty franchise. These include the introduction of "multi-team" games that allow matches to host three or more teams of players, in contrast to the traditional two factions, and revisions to the "Create-A-Class" function that allows users to select which guns, attachments, weapon camouflage and perks (additional bonuses that alter aspects of gameplay) to use in multiplayer matches. The "Kill Streak" function, which gives players in-game rewards for killing other players, was revised and is now known as "Score Streaks".

Whereas players still receive in-game rewards, these are unlocked by performing certain actions – such as killing other players, successfully capturing territory, and so on – rather than simply killing other players. Furthermore, the "wager matches" feature included in Call of Duty: Black Ops was removed. These changes were introduced to shift the emphasis towards objective-based gameplay, to reward players who work in teams and to make the game more accessible to new players.

There is also 3D support if players are playing with an HDMI cable on a 3D TV. Before entering multiplayer mode, there is a 3D setting in the "options" menu.

Japanese releases
Square Enix released the game for the Japanese market on November 22, 2012, as a subbed version. A Japanese voice-dubbed version was released separately on December 20, 2012. The script for this version was translated by Zenigame Nakamoto. The translated version was criticized for its translation errors. The Japanese release of the Wii U port is only the dubbed version since the console was not available in Japan in November.

Soundtrack

The game's soundtrack was composed by Jack Wall, with the main theme composed by Trent Reznor, the leader of industrial rock project Nine Inch Nails since 1988. The soundtrack was released as a part of the Hardened Edition and Care Package releases, as well as on iTunes and Amazon, with two supplemental tracks by Brian Tuey, as well as "Symphony No. 40 in G minor, K550 (Allegro Molto)" by Wolfgang Amadeus Mozart. Also, a version of the song "Try It Out" by Skrillex and Alvin Risk is used in the game, but it is not present in the soundtrack album. When the Campaign is completed, after the end credits, Woods and Menendez perform a concert with heavy metal band Avenged Sevenfold on their song "Carry On", with Woods on drums and Menendez on rhythm guitar. The band chose to use Woods as the drummer in the game due to the loss of their original drummer The Rev, who died of a drug overdose on December 28, 2009. The band's song "Shepherd of Fire" is featured on the Zombie mode Origins. Additional artists include Sean Murray, Jimmy Hinson, Sergio Jimenez Lacima, Kamar de los Reyes, Azam Ali, & Rudy Cardenas. A war track pack containing a selection of Black Ops II songs is featured in Black Ops Cold War's season two battle pass.

The Replacers

Heralding the release of Black Ops IIs DLCs, Activision releases a live-action short starring a well-groomed Peter Stormare, who acts as a "Replacer", part of a group who are sent by mutual friends to take your place during your daily life while you can stay at home and play Black Ops IIs new content. Stormare goes on to explain the aims of his jobs and is then shown in multiple situations where he has taken over random people's jobs, such as masquerading as a pregnant lady's husband, working at an office, and enduring a grandmother's endless talking, as well as other such scenarios.

To promote Black Ops IIs second DLC, entitled "Uprising", comedian J.B. Smoove joined Stormare in the second production of The Replacers, in which the two maintain a haphazard relationship. Stormare normally acts as a mentor to the new replacer Smoove by pointing out his various quirks while doing his job, such as his poor performance defending his client while he replaces a lawyer, admitting that he might be guilty.

Downloadable content
A Black Ops II Season Pass was released by Treyarch with the release of the game. On December 12, 2012, all Xbox 360 Season Pass holders received access to the Nuketown Zombies map, with PC holders following on January 17, and PlayStation 3 holders on January 19, having been delayed two days due to PSN technical issues. It was later released as an individual download for PC on April 13, 2013.

The first major DLC pack is called Revolution. It was announced on January 8, 2013, and released for Xbox 360 on January 29 and PC and PS3 on February 28 The pack contained four new multiplayer maps: Downhill, Hydro, Mirage and Grind; and two new Zombies modes: Turned and Die Rise. Also included was the first DLC weapon: the Peacekeeper. Turned occurs in the Diner segment of the TranZit map from the original release, and allows up to four players to fight each other in two teams – one human against three zombies. The Die Rise map is a larger zombies survival map taking place in two semi-destroyed skyscrapers in Shanghai, where one to four players use elevators to travel between floors.

Personalization pack microtransactions for the game were released for Xbox 360 on March 12, 2013, and PC and PS3 on April 12. These allow the player to make small aesthetic changes to the multiplayer functionality of the game, like adding the flag of their country to the kill notification box, adding new weapon skins and allowing the player to use more Create-a-Class slots.

The second major DLC pack is known as Uprising. It was released for Xbox 360 on April 16, 2013, and came out for PC and PS3 players on 16 May. It includes the new zombies map Mob of the Dead as well as new multiplayer maps Magma, Vertigo, Encore, and a re-imagining of fan-favorite from previous installment Black Ops Firing Range, known as Studio.

The third major DLC pack is called Vengeance. It was released for Xbox 360 on July 2, 2013, and for PC and PS3 on August 1. It includes new zombies map Buried as well as new multiplayer maps Cove, Detour, Rush and a remake of the popular map Summit from Black Ops: Uplink.

The fourth and final major DLC pack is called Apocalypse. It was released for Xbox 360 on August 27, 2013, and PC and PS3 on September 26. It includes new zombies map Origins back to the old characters (Takeo, Nikolai, Richtofen and Dempsey), as well as new multiplayer maps Pod, Frost and two remakes of popular maps Courtyard and Stadium of Call of Duty: World at War and Black Ops: First Strike DLC.

On August 7, 2014, Activision released Nuketown 2025 for the Wii U Version. None of the DLC packs released for the Xbox 360, PS3, and PC were released for Wii U.

Reception

Critical reception
Call of Duty: Black Ops II received "generally positive" reviews for the PlayStation 3, Xbox 360, and Wii U versions, but "mixed or average" reviews for the PC version, according to review aggregator Metacritic. IGN editor Anthony Gallegos describes the game as "a good example of how to evolve an annualized franchise." Gallegos praised the game for telling a story was genuinely interesting and creating a villain that he empathised with to the point of questioning his own actions over the course of the story. Gallegos directed criticisms at the artificial intelligence of allies in Strike Force mode and at the ending of the campaign, which he felt was disappointing even though he was aware that the outcome was directly influenced by the choices he made.

Marty Sliva of 1UP gave the game a B+ while praising it's freedom of choice in game modes and gameplay variety: "I was surprised with the risks that Treyarch took in the name of delivering a unique and creative experience. Not all of them paid off, but knowing that the team was willing to eschew the safe route helped ward off any stagnation that may have begun to creep into the series as of late."

Dan Ryckert of Game Informer was also critical of the artificial intelligence of Strike Force mode, and was unimpressed by the "Pick Ten" system introduced to multiplayer modes, noting that it was "interesting, but ultimately less exciting" than the system used in previous Call of Duty titles. Like Gallegos, Ryckert praised the narrative and structure of the single-player campaign, introducing changes that he felt were overdue and noting that the branching storylines "had me talking to others about their experiences in a way I had never done before with this [Call of Duty] series".

Steven O'Donnell and Stephanie Bendixsen, of video game talk show Good Game, both gave the game an 8.5 out of 10, praising the gameplay multiplayer and zombies mode, but were critical of the campaign's confusing narrative and Strike Force missions. In particular to the narrative, Good Game was critical of the opening battle where the player guns down fleeing African rebels, feeling that it was added purely for shock value and commenting that:

Frederick Charles Fripp of IT News Africa gave it a final score of 9.2/10 and wrote that "BO2 is a non-stop action-packed shooter that will keep gamers on their toes and on the edge of their seats. It has everything a player could want in a game: great graphics, a good story, easy controls and superb acting."

Sales and revenue
Activision reported Black Ops II grossed over $500 million in its first 24 hours, making it the biggest entertainment launch of all time until the record was surpassed by Grand Theft Auto V in September 2013. It is the fourth year in a row that the Call of Duty series has broken the same record. 2011's Call of Duty: Modern Warfare 3 grossed $400 million on one full day; 2010's Call of Duty: Black Ops grossed $360 million on day one; in 2009, Call of Duty: Modern Warfare 2 brought in $310 million. By November 24, 2012, it had sold more than 7.5 million copies in the United States.

Black Ops II went on to gross $1 billion in the first 15 days of availability, beating Modern Warfare 3s record of the first 16 days. On November 5, 2013, IGN confirmed that the game sold 24.2 million copies, making it the third highest-selling game in the series, behind 2010's Black Ops, and 2011's Modern Warfare 3.

Lawsuit
In July 2014, Manuel Noriega sued Activision for lost profits from the use of his likeness in the game. He also claims that his inclusion translated to higher sales of Black Ops II. Noriega makes an appearance in the Cold War portions of the game and aids the primary antagonist. The suit sought compensation for lost profits and damages for his depiction as a "kidnapper, murderer, and enemy of the state" in the game. On October 28, the Los Angeles court dismissed the lawsuit, ruling that Noriega's inclusion was protected under free speech laws.

The publisher, Activision, was also sued in a French court by family members of Jonas Savimbi, who thought his portrayal in the game was inaccurate, saying he was portrayed as a "barbarian". Three of his children wanted 1 million euros for damages. The French court dismissed the case in 2016.

Notes

References

External links

2012 video games
Video games set in 2025
Activision games
Black Ops II
Cold War video games
First-person shooters
Science fiction shooter video games
Interquel video games
Martyrdom in fiction
Military science fiction video games
Multiplayer and single-player video games
Nintendo Network games
PlayStation 3 games
Fiction about purgatory
Science fiction video games
South African Border War in popular culture
Square Enix games
Treyarch games
Video games set in 1986
Video games set in 1989
Alternate history video games
Video games about terrorism
Video games set in Afghanistan
Video games set in Angola
Video games set in the Cayman Islands
Video games set in China
Video games set in Haiti
Video games set in France
Video games set in India
Video games set in Kyrgyzstan
Video games set in Los Angeles
Video games set in Nevada
Video games set in Washington (state)
Video games set in Georgia (U.S. state)
Video games set in New York City
Video games set in Myanmar
Video games set in Nicaragua
Video games set in Pakistan
Video games set in Panama
Video games set in Saudi Arabia
Video games set in Singapore
Video games set in San Francisco
Video games set in Yemen
Video games set in Japan
Video games set in England
Video games set in the Netherlands
Video games set in Taiwan
Video games set in the 1980s
Video games set in the 2020s
War video games set in the United States
Video games scored by Jack Wall
Video games with alternate endings
Angolan Civil War video games
Soviet–Afghan War video games
Insurgency in Khyber Pakhtunkhwa fiction
Wii U games
Windows games
Works by David S. Goyer
Xbox 360 games
Video games about the United States Navy SEALs
Video games about zombies
Video games using Havok
Drones in fiction
Video games developed in the United States